Gianni Ocleppo (born 6 April 1957) is a retired Italian tennis player.

He has two children: one of them, Julian Ocleppo (born 1997), is a professional tennis player, by former wife Dee Ocleppo.

Career
Ocleppo won one ATP Tour singles title (Linz, 1981) and two doubles titles in his career. He played for Italy in the final of the 1980 Davis Cup, losing in a dead rubber to Ivan Lendl. Ocleppo reached a career-high singles ranking of world No. 30 in December 1979. His career-high doubles ranking is world No. 53, achieved in May 1987.

Career finals

Singles: 4 (1 title, 3 runner-ups)

Doubles: 7 (2 titles, 5 runner-ups)

References

External links
 
 
 

1957 births
Living people
Sportspeople from the Province of Cuneo
Italian male tennis players
20th-century Italian people